Teutobod was a king of the Teutons, who, together with the allied Cimbri, invaded the Roman Republic in the Cimbrian War and won a spectacular victory at the Battle of Arausio in 105 BC. He was later captured at the Battle of Aquae Sextiae in 102 BC.

Life 
In the late 2nd century BC, together with their neighbors, allies, and possible relatives, the Cimbri, the Teutons attacked south into the Danube valley, southern Gaul and northern Italy. Here they began to intrude upon the lands of Rome (Julius Caesar, in his Gallic Wars account De Bello Gallico, reports that it was the Boii who had attacked Noricum). The inevitable conflict which followed is called the Cimbrian War. The Cimbri (under their King Boiorix) and the Teutons, won the opening battles of this war, defeating tribes allied with the Romans and destroying a huge Roman army at the Battle of Arausio in 105 BC. But Rome regrouped and reorganized under Consul Gaius Marius. In 104 BC the Cimbri left the Rhône valley to raid Spain, while the Teutons remained in Gaul, still strong but not powerful enough to march on Rome on their own. This gave Marius time to build a new army and in 102 BC he moved against the Teutons. At the Battle of Aquae Sextiae the Teutons were virtually annihilated and Teutobod along with, reportedly, 20,000 of his people, were captured. After this, he and his tribe drop out of history. He most likely was sent to Rome for a triumphal procession to celebrate his defeat, then ritually executed afterward. The following year, the Cimbri would suffer a similar fate at the Battle of Vercellae, where two of their leaders, Caesorix and Claodicus, were captured, while two other leaders, Boiorix and Lugius, were killed.

References

2nd-century BC monarchs
2nd-century BC rulers in Europe
2nd-century BC Germanic people
Germanic rulers
Germanic warriors
People of the Cimbrian War
Pre-Roman Iron Age